The Federal Correctional Institution, Beckley (FCI Beckley) is a medium-security United States federal prison for male inmates in West Virginia. It is operated by the Federal Bureau of Prisons, a division of the United States Department of Justice. An adjacent satellite camp houses minimum-security inmates.

FCI Beckley is located approximately 51 miles southeast of Charleston, West Virginia and 136 miles northwest of Roanoke, Virginia.

Notable incidents
While they occur less frequently than at high-security prisons, serious acts of violence also occur at medium and minimum-security institutions such as FCI Beckley. In April 2010, FCI Beckley inmate Sylvester Cuevas, who was serving a sentence for mailing threatening communications, repeatedly punched a correction officer, causing the officer to sustain a broken nose and facial cuts. Cuevas was charged with felony assault and transferred to the Southern Regional Jail in Raleigh County, West Virginia pending court proceedings. Cuevas assaulted another correction officer at that facility in August 2010, who suffered a broken facial bone. On February 2, 2012, Cuevas pleaded guilty to felony assault in connection with both incidents and was sentenced to an additional eight years in prison. Cuevas was transferred to ADX Florence, the federal supermax prison in Colorado which holds inmates requiring the tightest security controls. He has since been moved to USP Atlanta.

Notable inmates (current and former)

See also

List of U.S. federal prisons
Federal Bureau of Prisons
Incarceration in the United States

References 

Buildings and structures in Raleigh County, West Virginia
Federal Correctional Institutions in the United States
Prisons in West Virginia